Joaquim Casimiro Rodrigues Ferreira (1898 – 31 July 1945), is a former Portuguese footballer and manager. As a footballer he played as a central defender for Vitória de Setúbal and Sporting CP and he was capped for Portugal twice.

External links 
 

Portuguese footballers
Association football defenders
Sporting CP footballers
Vitória F.C. players
Portugal international footballers
Place of birth missing
1898 births
1945 deaths